Prince George-Mount Robson was a provincial electoral district for the Legislative Assembly of British Columbia, Canada from 1991 to 2009.

Geography

History 
The riding was created for the 1991 election from part of Prince George South. It was abolished before the 2009 election into Prince George-Valemount.

MLAs 
Lois Boone, NDP (1991–2001)
Shirley Bond, Liberal (2001–present)

Member of Legislative Assembly 

Its MLA is Hon. Shirley Bond who was first elected in 2001. She represents the British Columbia Liberal Party. Mrs. Bond was appointed Minister of Health Services and Deputy Premier in 2004. She has previously served as Minister of Advanced Education.

Election results 

|-

|-
 
|NDP
|Wayne Mills
|align="right"|4,994
|align="right"|34.85%
|align="right"|
|align="right"|$65,715

|Independent
|Paul Nettleton
|align="right"|2,158
|align="right"|15.06%
|align="right"|
|align="right"|$10,207

|}

|-

|-
 
|NDP
|Todd Whitcombe
|align="right"|2,655
|align="right"|18.42%
|align="right"|
|align="right"|$10,219

|}

|-
 
|NDP
|Lois Boone
|align="right"|4,713
|align="right"|40.67%
|align="right"|
|align="right"|$33,423
|-

|}

|-
 
|NDP
|Lois Boone
|align="right"|5,751
|align="right"|50.99%
|align="right"|
|align="right"|$21,158
|-

|Independent
|William W. Kordyban
|align="right"|1,393
|align="right"|12.35%
|align="right"|
|align="right"|$8,934

|}

External links 
BC Stats Profile - 2001 (pdf)
Results of 2001 election (pdf)
2001 Expenditures
Results of 1996 election
1996 Expenditures
Results of 1991 election
1991 Expenditures
Website of the Legislative Assembly of British Columbia

Former provincial electoral districts of British Columbia
Politics of Prince George, British Columbia